Estonia competed at the 1932 Summer Olympics in Los Angeles, United States.

The 1932 Estonian Olympic Team
Estonian Olympic Committee did not send a full team to those games due to financial problems and tried to recruit Estonians living in the United States. Most of them were not prepared to compete on a short notice, and only Alfred Maasik and Osvald Käpp agreed.

 Representatives
Estonian National Olympic representative was professor Ants Piip. Estonian attaché was an electrical engineer Charles Kodil.
 Other delegations

Athletics

Men
Track & road events

Wrestling

Men's Greco-Roman

Men's Freestyle

References

External links
 EOK – Los Angeles 1932 
 Official Olympic Reports

Nations at the 1932 Summer Olympics
1932
1932 in Estonian sport